This article contains information about the literary events and publications of 1669.

Events
May 31 – Samuel Pepys makes the last entry in his diary.
unknown dates
Frances Boothby's tragicomedy Marcelia, or, The Treacherous Friend is performed by the King's Company at the Theatre Royal, Drury Lane, the first play by a woman to be produced in London.
The final section of Parthenissa, the prose romance by Roger Boyle, 1st Earl of Orrery, is published. Earlier portions of the work have appeared in 1651 and 1654–1656.

New books

Prose
Anonymous (Gabriel-Joseph de la Vergne?) – Letters of a Portuguese Nun (Les Lettres portugaises)
Hans Jakob Christoffel von Grimmelshausen – Simplicius Simplicissimus (first major novel in the German language, dated this year but probably published in 1668)
Blaise Pascal – Pensees (published posthumously)
William Penn – No Cross, No Crown
Jan Swammerdam – 
John Wagstaffe – The Question of Witchcraft Debated

Drama
Anonymous – The Imperial Tragedy
John Dryden – Tyrannic Love
Roger Boyle, 1st Earl of Orrery 
Guzman
Mr. Anthony
Robert Howard and George Villiers, Duke of Buckingham – The Country Gentleman (written, not staged)
John Lacy – The Dumb Lady
Jean Racine – Britannicus

Births
December 16 – Joseph-Anne-Marie de Moyriac de Mailla, French missionary and translator in China (died 1748)
unknown dates
Nicholas Blundell, English diarist (died 1737)
Lady Lucy Herbert, English devotional writer (died 1744)
Jiang Tingxi (蒋廷锡), Chinese encyclopedist (died 1732)
probable – Susanna Centlivre, English poet and actress (died 1723)

Deaths
February 3 – Catharina Questiers, Dutch poet and dramatist (born 1631)
March 19 – John Denham, Irish poet (born 1615)
July 10 or 11 – Robert Stapylton, English dramatist and courtier (born c. 1607–1609)
September 30 – Henry King, English poet and bishop (born 1592)
October 8 – Jane Cavendish, English poet and playwright (born 1621)
December 16 – Nathaniel Fiennes, English pamphleteer, soldier and politician (born c. 1608)
December 24 – Henry Foulis, English theologian and controversialist (born 1638)

References

 
Years of the 17th century in literature